Matthew Kidd (born 27 October 1979) is a freestyle swimmer from Great Britain.

Swimming career
Matthew competed in the 100 metre freestyle at the 2004 Summer Olympics in Athens, Greece, finishing 23rd fastest overall. He combined with the British squad to place 8th in the 4×100 metre medley relay final in a time of 3 minutes 37.77 seconds. His anchor split was 49.14 seconds, marginally slower than his preliminary split time of 49.05 seconds.

He won the 2002 and 2004 British Championship in 100 metres freestyle.

See also
 List of Commonwealth Games medallists in swimming (men)

References

External links
British Swimming athlete profile

1979 births
English male swimmers
Swimmers at the 2004 Summer Olympics
Commonwealth Games medallists in swimming
Living people
People educated at Ewell Castle School
Commonwealth Games silver medallists for England
Universiade medalists in swimming
Swimmers at the 2002 Commonwealth Games
Universiade gold medalists for Great Britain
Olympic swimmers of Great Britain
Medalists at the 2003 Summer Universiade
Medallists at the 2002 Commonwealth Games